Jasper's Green is a hamlet in the civil parish of Shalford and the Braintree district of Essex, England. Other parish hamlets are Shalford Green and Church End.

Further reading 
 Listed buildings in Jasper's Green

Hamlets in Essex
Braintree District